José Enrique Serrano (born October 24, 1943) is an American politician who was a member of the U.S. House of Representatives from 1990 until his retirement in 2021. Serrano, a Democrat from New York, represented a district that is one of the smallest in the country geographically, consisting of a few square miles of the heavily populated South Bronx in New York City. His district was also one of the most densely populated and one of the few majority Hispanic districts in the country. He was the longest-serving Hispanic-American in the House. He did not run for re-election in 2020 due to a diagnosis of Parkinson's disease, and Ritchie Torres was elected to succeed him.

Early life, education, and military service

Serrano was born in Mayagüez, Puerto Rico. At the age of seven, Serrano was taken by his family to The Bronx, where he was raised in the Millbrook Houses. Serrano went to Grace Dodge Vocational High School in the Bronx and briefly attended Lehman College in 1961. He served as a private in the 172nd Support Battalion of the United States Army Medical Corps from 1964 to 1966. Serrano was employed by Manufacturers Hanover Bank from 1961 to 1969, except for his military service, and served on New York City's District 7 School Board from 1969 to 1974. He was also chairman of the South Bronx Community Corporation and a delegate to the 1976 Democratic National Convention.

New York Assembly

Serrano was a member of the New York State Assembly from 1975 to 1990, sitting in the 181st, 182nd, 183rd, 184th, 185th, 186th, 187th and 188th New York State Legislatures. His district was numbered the 75th until 1982, and the 73rd from 1983 on. He was Chairman of the Committee on Consumer Affairs (1979-1983), and the Committee on Education (1983-1990).

U.S. House of Representatives

Elections
In 1990, Serrano won a special election for the seat vacated by resigning U.S. Congressman Robert García with 92% of the vote. He never won re-election with less than 92% of the vote in what is considered one of the safest seats in Congress.

In 2004, Serrano faced an electoral challenge from Jose Serrano, an unemployed former loading dockworker with the same name who eventually dropped out of the race in July.

Tenure

A member of the Progressive Caucus, Serrano was widely regarded as one of the most progressive members of Congress. He was questioned about his pork barrel spending by some fiscally conservative members of Congress. Arizona Congressman Jeff Flake once said of Serrano's $150,000 earmark to repair the roof at the city-owned Arthur Avenue Market (a historic indoor produce and prepared food market in the Bronx's "Little Italy"), "I would argue this is one cannoli the taxpayer doesn't want to take a bite of." Serrano replied to Flake, "The more you get up on these, sir, the more I realize that you do not know what you are talking about. I make no excuses about the fact that I earmark dollars to go in the poorest congressional district in the nation, which is situated in the richest city on earth."

On November 18, 2005, Serrano was one of three members of the House of Representatives to vote in favor of immediate withdrawal of American troops from Iraq. The other two votes were from Cynthia McKinney of Georgia and Robert Wexler of Florida.

In 1997 [HJR 19], 1999 [HJR 17], 2001 [HJR 4], 2003 [HJR 11], 2005 [HJR 9], 2007 [HJR 8], 2009 [HJR 5], 2011 [HJR 17], and 2013 [HJR 15], Serrano introduced a joint resolution proposing an amendment to the Constitution of the United States to repeal the 22nd Amendment, thereby removing presidential term limits. Each resolution died without ever getting past the committee.

Serrano paid attention to local environmental issues in New York, with a particular focus on constructing greenways, acquiring parklands, and cleaning up the Bronx River, which ran through his district.  Recently a beaver was discovered swimming in the river for the first time in 200 years, something seen as a testament to his efforts.  In 2007, he engineered the purchase of the last privately-owned island in New York harbor—South Brother Island—for preservation in perpetuity by the City of New York as a wildlife refuge for rare shorebirds.

Serrano was one of three New York-area congressmen on the House Appropriations Committee, the others being Nita Lowey of the 18th district and Grace Meng of the 6th district. At the end of his tenure, he was the ranking member of the Appropriations Subcommittee on Financial Services, having previously served as the chair.  As chairman, he successfully engineered the inclusion of language in the 2007 omnibus spending bill that guaranteed the extension of the 50 State Quarters program to include the minting of six additional quarters to honor the District of Columbia and the five United States territories, including Serrano's native Puerto Rico.

Serrano advocated for Puerto Ricans under FBI prosecution. In May 2000, he brokered an agreement with then-FBI Director Louis Freeh, then-Puerto Rican Independence Party Electoral Commissioner Manuel Rodríguez Orellana and then-Puerto Rico Senate Federal Affairs Committee chairman (and future Puerto Rico Senate President and Secretary of State) Kenneth McClintock that resulted in the release of nearly 100,000 pages of previously secret FBI files on Puerto Rican political activists.

Serrano was a critic of the Bush administration's approach to handling President Hugo Chávez of Venezuela. In 2005, while the Venezuelan President was in New York City speaking before the United Nations, the congressman invited him to his district to speak to his constituency. After Chávez' death, Serrano published condolences via Twitter, describing him as a leader who "understood the needs of the poor" and was "committed to empowering the powerless". Serrano's tweet prompted a response from the Republican National Committee, which asserted that it was "simply insulting that a Democrat Congressman would praise the authoritarian ruler Hugo Chávez".

Serrano criticized Brazil's president Jair Bolsonaro. In March 2019, he and 29 other Democratic lawmakers wrote a letter to Secretary of State Mike Pompeo that read in part, "Since the election of far-right candidate Jair Bolsonaro as president, we have been particularly alarmed by the threat Bolsonaro’s agenda poses to the LGBTQ+ community and other minority communities, women, labor activists, and political dissidents in Brazil".

In March 2019, Serrano announced that he would not seek re-election in 2020 because he had been diagnosed with Parkinson's disease.

Committee assignments
Committee on Appropriations
Subcommittee on Commerce, Justice, Science, and Related Agencies
Subcommittee on Financial Services and General Government (Ranking Member)
Subcommittee on Interior, Environment, and Related Agencies

Caucus memberships
Congressional Hispanic Caucus 
Congressional Progressive Caucus.
International Conservation Caucus
Congressional Arts Caucus
Afterschool Caucuses
United States Congressional International Conservation Caucus

Party leadership
Senior Whip

Personal life
Serrano's son, José M. Serrano, is a member of the New York State Senate. In addition to José, Serrano has four other children.

In March 2019, Serrano announced that he had been diagnosed with Parkinson's disease and would not seek re-election in 2020.

See also

 List of Hispanic and Latino Americans in the United States Congress
 List of Puerto Ricans 
 Nuyorican
 Puerto Ricans in New York City
 Puerto Rico Democracy Act of 2007

References

External links

Profile  at SourceWatch
Rep. Jose Serrano: One of Three Congress members to Vote for Immediate U.S. Troop Withdrawal from Iraq, December 1, 2005

|-

|-

|-

|-

|-

|-

1943 births
Living people
21st-century American politicians
American politicians of Puerto Rican descent
Democratic Party members of the United States House of Representatives from New York (state)
Hispanic and Latino American members of the United States Congress
Hispanic and Latino American state legislators in New York (state)
Lehman College alumni
Democratic Party members of the New York State Assembly
Military personnel from New York City
People from Mayagüez, Puerto Rico
People with Parkinson's disease
Politicians from the Bronx
Puerto Rican people in New York (state) politics
School board members in New York (state)
United States Army soldiers